Sukamara Regency is one of the thirteen regencies which comprise the Central Kalimantan Province on the island of Kalimantan (Borneo), Indonesia. The town of Sukamara is the capital of Sukamara Regency, which covers an area of 3,827 km2. The population of the Regency was 44,952 at the 2010 Census and 63,464 at the 2020 Census; the official estimate as at mid 2021 was 64,941.

Administrative Districts 
Sukamara Regency consists of five districts (kecamatan), tabulated below with their areas and population totals from the 2010 Census and the 2020 Census, together with the official estimates as at mid 2021. The table also includes the locations of the district administrative centres, the number of administrative villages (rural desa and urban kelurahan) in each district, and its postal codes.

Note: (a) Jelai District includes four small offshore islands - Pulau Jamban, Pulau Nibung Hilir, Pulau Nibung Hulu and Pulau Tangguk.

Demographics 
Religion as of the Indonesian census of 2010:
Muslim  78.9%
Protestant  8.4%
Roman Catholic  4.6%
Buddhist  0.3%
Hindu  0.2%
Confucian  0.1%
Other  7.3%
Not stated or not asked  0.3%

Climate
Sukamara has a tropical rainforest climate (Af) with heavy rainfall year-round.

External links

References

Regencies of Central Kalimantan